Agnes of Brunswick-Grubenhagen (died: 18 November 1439) was, from 1412 to 1439, abbess of Gandersheim Abbey as Agnes II.

Life 
She was a daughter of Eric I, Duke of Brunswick-Grubenhagen.  She was about six years old when she was elected abbess of Gandersheim Abbey.  The pope confirmed Agnes's election while she was a minor while Agnes, however, he appointed a dean of the Abbey as her guardian and regent.  Around 1425, Agnes began to rule without a regent.

She died in 1439 and was buried in the abbey church.

Guelph inheritance division 
In connection with the Guelph inheritance division after the Lords of Homburg died out, she transferred the castle and town of Gandersheim and the castles of Seesen and Stauffenburg to Otto II of Brunswick-Göttingen.  She transferred Asseburg Castle, Gifhorn, Castle and City of Lüneburg, Greene Castle, Lüthorst, one half of the fief of Homburg, Lauenstein Castle, and the former County of Wernigerode to William I of Brunswick-Wolfenbüttel.

References 

Secular abbesses
Old House of Brunswick
1406 births
Year of birth uncertain
1439 deaths
15th-century German women
15th-century German people
Place of birth unknown
Place of death unknown
Abbesses of Gandersheim
Daughters of monarchs